My Holo Love is a 2020 South Korean television series starring Yoon Hyun-min and Ko Sung-hee. It was released on Netflix on February 7, 2020.

Synopsis
Because of her face blindness disorder, Han So-yeon decided to live a reclusive life. This changes when she starts using the AI program Holo whose appearance is the same as the developer, Go Nan-do. The latter slowly falls in love with So-yeon but his cold personality, which contrasts with Holo's, isn't in his favor.

Cast

Main
 Yoon Hyun-min as Go Nan-do / Holo
 Ko Sung-hee as Han So-yeon
 Kim Ha-yeon  as young So-yeon

Supporting
 Choi Yeo-jin as Go Yoo-jin
 Hwang Chan-sung as Baek Chan-sung
 Lee Jung-eun as So-yeon's mother
 Kang Seung-hyun as Yoo-ram
 Kim Yong-min as assistant
 Kim Soo-jin as Nan-do's mother
 Son Jong-hak as Nam Gi-ho
 Yang Dae-hyuk as Lee Dong-shik	
 Jung Young-ki as Jo Jin-seok
 Jung Yeon-joo as Detective Ji-na
 Nam Myung-ryul as Baek Nam-gyu
 Gong Min-jeung as Choi Seung-kwon

Special appearances
 Lee Ki-chan as Yeon Gang-woo (Ep. 1–4)
 Kim Yong-man (Ep. 3 & 8)
 Baek Jin-hee (Ep. 6, voice only)
 Ahn Hye-kyung (Ep. 6 (voice only) & 10)Alice

Episodes

Original soundtrack

Production
Ryu Yong-jae was inspired to write the story after seeing the computer program AlphaGo beat the former professional Go player Lee Sedol during the 2016 historic match.

References

External links
 
 
 

2020 South Korean television series debuts
2020 South Korean television series endings
South Korean romance television series
South Korean science fiction television series
Korean-language Netflix original programming
Television series about artificial intelligence
Television series by Studio Dragon